The Grepor Butch Belgica Story (also known as The Butch Belgica Story) is a 1995 Filipino biographical action film co-edited directed by Toto Natividad. The film stars Joko Diaz as Butch Belgica, the country’s most notorious delinquent during the Marcos administration. It was one of the entries in the 1995 Manila Film Festival.

The film is streaming online on YouTube.

Cast

Joko Diaz as Grepor "Butch" Belgica
Ronaldo Valdez as Butch's Father
Boots Anson-Roa as Butch's Mother
Albert Martinez as Ruben Umali
Gary Estrada as Butch's Friend
Kier Legaspi as Butch's Friend
Richard Bonnin as Butch's Friend
Rommel Montano as Butch's Friend
Ferdinand Galang as Butch's Friend
Gino Ilustre as Butch's Friend
Raul Flores as Butch's Friend
Ara Mina as Girlfriend No. 1
Cristina Gonzales as Girlfriend No. 2
Isabel Granada as Girlfriend No. 3
Vina Morales as Girlfriend No. 4
Rufa Mae Quinto as Shirley
Shintaro Valdez as Jun Belgica
Rez Cortez as Val
Daniel Fernando as Rodel
Gene Padilla as Butch's Enemy
Carlos David as Butch's Enemy
Roel de Villa as Butch's Enemy
Mon Esguerra as Butch's Enemy
Allan Garcia as Butch's Enemy
Bembol Roco as Enemy in Jail
Kate Yasay as Butch's Sister
Angelica del Carmen as Butch's Sister
Emma Moran as Butch's Sister
Lucky Kristine Garcia as Butch's Sister
Johannes Belgica as Young Butch 
Ama Quiambao as Judge 
Roldan Aquino as Leader 
Gamaliel Viray as Mayor 
Danny Labra as Cagiatan Man 
Jimmy Reyes as Cagiatan Man 
Polly Cadsawan as OS Agent
Elmer Jamias as OS Agent
Jun De Guzman as OS Agent
Johnny Vicar as Cousin in Law
Cesar Iglesia as Asst. Director, Muntinlupa
Pocholo Montes as Attorney
Telly Babasa as Bembol's Man
Ronald Montes as Bembol's Man
Leo Lazaro as BMI
Bong Gatus as BMI
Alex Toledo as BMI
Michael Nicor as BMI
Romy Romulo as Butch's Friend in Jail
Nemy Gutierrez as Butch's Friend in Jail
Cris Daluz as National Artist
Olive Madridejos as Dra. Alcantara
Nanding Fernandez as Speaker

Production
Grepor "Butch" Belgica brought in the idea for his biopic in 1985 with Rudy Fernandez tapped to portray him. Vic del Rosario Jr. of Viva Films stated at that time that he was interested in Belgica's story. It was only in 1991 when the project was revived, with Paquito Diaz reminding Belgica and a successful negotiation with del Rosario Jr. about it. With Fernandez being too old to portray him, Belgica chose Paquito's son Joko to portray him. This marked Joko's first major role after a string of supporting and co-lead roles in action films. Belgica co-wrote the screenplay with Ferdinand Galang.

References

External links

Full Movie on Viva Films

1995 films
1995 action films
Biographical action films
Filipino-language films
Films set in 1972
Films set in 1976
Philippine action films
Philippine biographical films
Viva Films films
Films directed by Toto Natividad